Rio Suryana (born 28 February 1977) is an Indonesian born, Australian badminton player. Suryana was the champion of the Oceania Championships in 1999. He competed at the 2000 Summer Olympics in Sydney in the men's singles and mixed doubles event.

Achievements

Oceania Championships
Men's singles

IBF Grand Prix 
Men's singles

IBF International
Men's singles

References

External links
 
 

1977 births
Living people
People from Bogor
Sportspeople from West Java
Australian people of Indonesian descent
Indonesian male badminton players
Australian male badminton players
Olympic badminton players of Australia
Badminton players at the 2000 Summer Olympics